Livia was the wife of Augustus and the most powerful woman in the early Roman Empire. 
Livia is a girl's name of Latin origin, meaning “blue”. From Roman times, this was the female derivative of the family name Livius. Looking back to these days, the color blue, and thus the name Livia, evoke incredible symbolism.
Livia is a common feminine given name in countries such as Italy, Brazil, France, Romania, Hungary, Cuba, Sweden, Germany and Switzerland. 
Livia was a literary favorite from the sixteenth century, appearing in the plays of John Fletcher and Thomas Middleton, and playing a minor role in Romeo and Juliet. Anna Livia Plurabelle is the name of a character in James Joyce's Finnegans Wake. 


People

Ancient world 
 Livia (mother of Cato) (c. 120 BC – c. 92 BC), mother of Cato the Younger and grandmother of Marcus Junius Brutus the Younger
 Livia Ocellina, second wife of the Roman Emperor Galba’s father
 Livia Orestilla, Roman empress (in 37 or 38) of Emperor Caligula
 Livia Medullina Camilla, second fiancee of the future emperor Claudius

Other 
 Livia d'Arco (c. 1565–1611), Italian singer
 Livia Brito (born 1986), Cuban-Mexican actress
 Livia Klausová (born 1943), Czech economist
 Lívia Rév (1916–2018), Hungarian musician
 Livia Turco (born 1955), Italian politician
 Livia Zita (born 1984), Hungarian graphic designer and singer, and the wife of King Diamond
 Livia Millhagen (born 1973), Swedish actress
 Livia Altmann (born 1994), Swiss ice hockey player
 Livia von Plettenberg (born 1988), Austrian kickboxer
 Livia Lancelot (born 1988), French motocross racer
 Lívia Andrade (born 1983), Brazilian actress and TV presenter
 Lívia Járóka (born 1974), Hungarian politician
 Livia Giuggioli (born 1969), Italian film producer
 Lívia Mossóczy (1936-2017), Hungarian table tennis player
 Livia Frege (1818-1891), German soprano singer
 Lívia Rusz (1930-2020), Romanian-Hungarian graphic artist
 Lívia Renata Souza (born 1991), Brazilian MMA artist

Fictional characters 
 Livia Beale, on the television drama Journeyman
 Livia Frye, on the soap opera All My Children
 Livia Soprano, on the television series The Sopranos
 Livia (see Eve (Xena)), a name adopted by a character in the television action series Xena: Warrior Princess
 Livia Blackthorn, in Cassandra Clare's Shadowhunter Chronicles 
 Livia Burlando, on the television series ‘’Inspector Montalbano’’

See also 
 Livilla, Roman noblewoman

Feminine given names
Scandinavian feminine given names
Italian feminine given names
Czech feminine given names
Hungarian feminine given names
Romanian feminine given names